William Graham Browne (1 January 1870 – March 11, 1937) was an Irish actor who appeared on Broadway and in films during the early 20th century. Born in Ireland, he was married first to actress Madge McIntosh and later to actress Marie Tempest. They appeared together in premieres of two plays by Noël Coward: Hay Fever (1925) and The Marquise (1927).

Selected Credits

Film

Theatre

References

External links

1870 births
1937 deaths
Deaths from pneumonia in England
Irish male stage actors
Irish male film actors
20th-century Irish male actors